Hicks-neutral technical change is change in the production function of a business or industry which satisfies certain economic neutrality conditions.  The concept of Hicks neutrality was first put forth in 1932 by John Hicks in his book The Theory of Wages.  A change is considered to be Hicks neutral if the change does not affect the balance of labor and capital in the products' production function.  More formally, given the Solow model production function
,
a Hicks-neutral change is one which only changes .

See also
List of production functions

References

Further reading
 
 
 
 

Production economics
Technological change